Mathías Fernando Rodríguez Leites (born 20 June 1997) is a Uruguayan footballer who plays as a defender for Miramar Misiones.

Career
In 2015, Rodríguez was sent on loan to the youth academy of Spanish La Liga side Real Madrid. Rodríguez started his career with Peñarol in the Uruguayan top flight, where he made 11 league appearances. On 4 September 2016, Rodríguez debuted for Peñarol during a 2–0 win over Fénix. 

Before the 2018 season, he signed for Uruguayan second tier club Cerro Largo. Before the 2022 season, he signed for Miramar Misiones in the Uruguayan third tier.

References

External links
 

Living people
1997 births
People from Rosario, Uruguay
Uruguayan footballers
Association football defenders
Uruguay youth international footballers
Uruguayan Primera División players
Uruguayan Segunda División players
Peñarol players
Cerro Largo F.C. players
Miramar Misiones players
Uruguayan expatriate footballers
Uruguayan expatriate sportspeople in Spain
Expatriate footballers in Spain